Miss Latina Australia is an Australian national beauty pageant was held in 2015 and 2016 run by E & E Events Management and Estela Tapia is National Director of the contest. It was first held at the Golden Star Receptions in Epping, Victoria on June 13, 2015 and designed for women of Latina descent who are Australian permanent residents or citizens. Tapia chose to send the winners of the 2015 and 2016 pageants all expenses paid to compete in the Miss América Latina international beauty contest.

The Miss Latina Australia pageant has received extensive coverage through National Spanish newspapers such as the Latin Australian Times and El Español and is a highlight for the Spanish speaking community in Australia. Filipinos with Hispanic or Latino descent were encouraged to participate, Miss Latina Australia 2015 Eva Giollo is of Argentinian and Filipino descent, 2016 Finalist Andrea Atherton was also of Filipino decent, this received much attention from the Australian Filipino community though their leading print national newspaper The Philippine Times.

The current titleholder is Georgette Psarreas who was crowned on July 9, 2016 in The Regent Ballroom, Melbourne, Victoria.

Charity 
The Miss Latina Australia contest supports the “Hogar Maria Auxiliadora” Orphanage in Cochabamba, Bolivia. Many of the finalists fundraise for this cause and the most successful fundraiser is awarded the Miss Latina Australia Charity Award.

Miss Latina Australia 2016 
Miss Latina Australia 2016 took place on July 23, 2016, in the Regent Ballroom in Northcote, Melbourne. 12 finalists participated in the gala event. At the conclusion of the final event Georgette Psarreas (Chilean & Greek) was crowned Miss Latina Australia with Daniella Seoane (Uruguayan) second place and Miss charity. Jesica Bustamante (El Salvadorian)  won title of people's choice, Tatiana Castiblanco (Colombian) winning Miss Photogenic.

Titleholders

External links
Official website

See also
 List of beauty contests
 Miss Latina Australia 2016
 Miss Lindeza 2017

References 

 
Beauty pageants for people of specific ethnic or national descents
Beauty pageants in Australia